Big Timers is a 1945 American musical comedy race film directed by Bud Pollard. The bottom of a poster for the film notes "The secrets of a chambermaid in a Sugar Hill Hotel!"

The film features a love story.

Cast
Stepin Fetchit
Francine Everett
Lou Swarz
Gertrude Saunders
Tarzana as The Whoopie Dancer
Milton Woods
Duke Williams
Walter Earle
Ed Hunter
Rocky Brown

References

External links

1945 films
1945 musical comedy films
American short films
African-American musical comedy films
Race films
American black-and-white films
1940s English-language films
1940s American films